Vinicoloraobovella is a genus of mites in the family Urodinychidae.

Species
 Vinicoloraobovella rubra (Athias-Binche, 1983)

References

Mesostigmata
Acari genera